Richard Challenger was a British colonial governor. He was Chief magistrate of Anguilla from 1842 until 1846. He was later appointed Auditor-General for Saint Christopher in 1867.

References

Chief magistrates of Anguilla